Volleyball at the 2010 South American Games in Medellín was held from March 20 to March 29. All games were played at Coliseo de Envigado, Coliseo Yesid Santos.

Medal summary

Medal table

Men

Group stage

Group A

Group B

5th/6th placement

Semifinals

Bronze-medal match

Gold-medal match

Women

Group stage

Group A

Group B

5th/6th placement

Semifinals

Bronze-medal match

Gold-medal match

References

2010 South American Games
South American Games
2010